William Crofts may refer to:
William Crofts, 1st Baron Crofts (c. 1611–1677), English Peer and Gentleman of the Bedchamber
William Crofts (MP), Member of Parliament for Bury St Edmunds, 1685–89
William Carr Crofts (1846–1898), architect and photographer
William Crofts (rower) (1846–1912), rower and schoolmaster

See also
William Croft (disambiguation)